Let's Dance is a 1950 American Technicolor musical romantic comedy-drama film directed by Norman Z. McLeod starring Betty Hutton, Fred Astaire and Roland Young. It was produced and released by Paramount Pictures.

Plot
During World War II, Kitty McNeil (Betty Hutton) and her dance partner Donald Elwood (Fred Astaire) are performing for troops in London. Don announces his engagement to Kitty on stage, but Kitty later tells him she's recently married pilot Richard Everett, a member of a wealthy Boston family. Everett is killed soon after the marriage after being shot down.

Five years later, Kitty is locked in a struggle with her late husband's grandmother Serena (Lucille Watson) for the custody of Kitty and Richard's son, Richard "Richie" Everett VII (Gregory Moffett). Serena dislikes Kitty, and thinks she knows best about Richie's education. Kitty decides to flee to New York City with Richie.

Desperate for money, Don has taken a job at Larry Channock's (Barton MacLane) nightclub. Don runs into an out-of-work Kitty at a café, and manages to get her a job as a cigarette girl. However, Serena has sent her two lawyers Pohlwhistle (Roland Young) and Wagstaffe (Melville Cooper) to the club, where they subpoena Kitty in an attempt for Serena to gain custody of Richie. Don persuades Larry to give Kitty a steady job as his dance partner at the club, but various potentially embarrassing details about Richie not going to school and spending most of his time at the club emerge at court. However, all are easily answered by the kind nightclub staff. The judge gives Kitty sixty days to give Richie a stable home life, to which end Don agrees to marry Kitty. However, Don and Kitty get into an argument at the marriage license bureau, thus ending their short-lived engagement.

Kitty becomes engaged to the rich Timothy Bryant (Shepperd Strudwick), a friend of Don's. A jealous Don manages to end the engagement, and all looks well until Serena wins back custody of Richie. Kitty kidnaps Richie and hides him at the club. However, Don, who has made a substantial amount of money from selling a racehorse, manages to smooth things out between Kitty and Serena. A delighted Kitty agrees to marry Don.

Cast
 Betty Hutton as Kitty McNeil
 Fred Astaire as Donald Elwood
 Roland Young as Edmund Pohlwhistle
 Ruth Warrick as Carola Everett
 Lucile Watson as Serena Everett
 Gregory Moffett as Richard Everett
 Barton MacLane as Larry Channock
 Shepperd Strudwick as Timothy Bryant
 Melville Cooper as Charles Wagstaffe
 Harold Huber as Marcel
 George Zucco as Judge Mackenzie
 Peggy Badley as Bubbles Malone
 Virginia Toland as Elsie

Production
Buoyed by the great success of MGM teaming Astaire with their biggest female musical star Judy Garland in the 1948 musical blockbuster Easter Parade, Paramount decided to team Astaire with their biggest female musical star (Hutton) hoping that the same box-office magic would happen. Astaire's character, perhaps coincidentally, even possessed the same first name (Don) as in the 1948 film. Unfortunately, the film did not repeat the earlier film's success.

While the film did reasonably well financially, overall it proved to be a disappointment. Let's Dance was completely overshadowed by Hutton's other musical film of 1950, Annie Get Your Gun, which became one of the highest-grossing films of the year.

Hutton was loaned to MGM to replace Garland (because of illness) as Annie Oakley in Annie Get Your Gun.

Frank Loesser wrote the music.

Comic book adaptation
 Eastern Color Movie Love #7 (February 1951)

References

External links
 
 
 
 
 

1950 films
1950 musical comedy films
1950 romantic comedy films
American musical comedy films
American romantic comedy films
American romantic musical films
Films directed by Norman Z. McLeod
Paramount Pictures films
Films based on short fiction
Films scored by Robert Emmett Dolan
1950s English-language films
Films adapted into comics
1950s romantic musical films
1950s American films